The Bratislava Model United Nations (BratMUN) conference is an annual four-day event for high-school Model United Nations students. The conference is organized and held by the four IBD students from the IB program at Gymnasium Jur Hronec. BratMUN is funded by the Novohradska Foundation and supported financially or product-wise by numerous sponsors throughout the years. It is currently in its 20th installment.

Committee sessions 
BratMUN features a host of committees including the Security Council, Economic and Social Council, the Economic and Financial Affairs Council, the World Health Organization, the Human Rights Council, the International Court of Justice, the Disarmament and International Security, the Historical Security Council, etc. Delegates in these committees represent member states of the United Nations, explore approaches to foreign problems and establish resolutions addressing these issues. BratMUN has also featured a non-UN crisis committee. Some of the topics dealt by the delegates at BratMUN were the abolishment of the death penalty, nuclear disarmament, sea piracy, nuclear energy, the abolishment of sexual harassment at workplaces, or at armed conflicts, future regulations of digital privacy and much more.

Past venues 
Some of the past BratMUN conference premises include: 

 Pan-European university
 The Faculty of Natural Sciences of the Comenius University
 National Council of the Slovak Republic

Notable speakers 

 2001 - Mikulas Dzurinda (former Prime minister)
 2012 - Jean-Marie Bruno (French Ambassador), Lucia Zitnanska (ex-Minister of Justice SR), Theodor Sedgwick (American Ambassador), Sonja Wintersberger (Deputy to the Director of UNIS Vienna)
 2015 - Martin Bútora (Deputy to former president Andrej Kiska)
 2016 - Lucia Zitnanska (ex-Minister of Justice SR)
 2018 - Miroslav Lajcak (Slovak Minister of Foreign and European Affairs)

Other notable speakers 
Eduard Kukan (Minister of foreign affairs SVK), Ronald Weiser (Ambassador for USA in Slovakia), Michael Roberts (British Ambassador)

References

External links 

 Bratmun official website
 Gymnasium Jur Hronec official website
 Bratmun on SoundCloud

Model United Nations
Annual events in Slovakia